War on Waste (also known as War on Waste with Craig Reucassel) is an Australian documentary television series which first premiered on 16 May 2017 on ABC TV.

Broadcast 
The series first premiered on Tuesday, 16 May 2017 at 8:30pm and the second series premiered on Tuesday, 24 July 2018 at 8:30pm.

Summary 
Filmed in multiple locations across the country, War on Waste focuses on the impact and solutions to material waste in Australia. The series was inspired by the earlier BBC series, Hugh's War on Waste.

Critical reception 
In July 2019, TV Week listed War on Waste at No. 95 in its list of the 101 greatest Australian television shows of all time, which appeared in its monthly TV Week Up Close magazine. The magazine recognised the show for creating public awareness and prompting legislative changes, and for encouraging the nation to be mindful of waste.

Episodes

Season 1 (2017)

Special

Season 2 (2018)

Awards

See also
Litter in Australia
Recycling in Australia

References

External links 

Australian Broadcasting Corporation original programming
2010s Australian documentary television series
2017 Australian television series debuts